The Fredrikstad Bridge is an arch bridge in the city of Fredrikstad in Viken county, Norway. It crosses the river Glomma, and connects the western and eastern parts of the city. The bridge is 824 metres long, with a main span of 196 metres. The sailing height is 39,5 metres. The bridge was opened August 18, 1957, by the then crown prince Olav. It is a slightly larger copy of the 2 year older Karmsund bridge. The bridge is protected as a national heritage.

References

External links

Fredrikstad Bridge on en.Broer.no

Buildings and structures in Fredrikstad
Road bridges in Viken